The Wind of Travel is a 1978 Soviet drama film directed by Yuri Yegorov.

Plot 
The film takes place during the Great Patriotic War. Mitrash and Nastya were left without parents. The whole village helped them stay alive. And suddenly they receive a letter from which they learn that their father is alive.

Cast 
 Galina Astakhova - Nastya
 Sergei Kuznetsov - Mitrasha
 Vladimir Marchenko - Vasiliy
 Yuriy Nazarov - Manuilo
 Sergey Yakovlev - grandad
 Marina Yakovleva - Marfutka
 Alexander Zhdanov - Stepan

References

External links 
 

1978 films
1970s Russian-language films
Soviet drama films
1978 drama films